Ruscher or Rüscher is a German surname. Notable people with this surname include:

 (1928–2015), East German politician (SED)
Martina Rüscher (born 1972), Austrian politician (ÖVP)
Thomas Ruscher (1449–1510), former Auxiliary Bishop of Mainz

German-language surnames